Dundocera is a genus of spiders in the family Ochyroceratidae. It was first described in 1951 by Machado. , it contains 3 species, all from Angola.

References

Endemic fauna of Angola
Ochyroceratidae
Araneomorphae genera
Spiders of Africa